Boavus is an extinct genus of boa known primarily from Eocene-aged strata of North America. At least three species (B. occidentalis, B. idelmani, and possibly B. agilis) are known from the Middle Eocene Green River lagerstätte in Wyoming, two species from Eocene strata of Uinta County (B. occidentalis again, B. brevis), and at least one species is known from the middle to late Eocene-aged Sespe Formation of California (B. affinis).

Post-Eocene specimens

Three vertebrae very similar in form, if not identical to those of B. occidentalis were found in early Oligocene-aged strata of South Dakota.  Remains of what may be B. affinis are found in Late Miocene (Early Barstovian-aged) strata of Trinity River in Texas.

References

Eocene snakes
Boinae
Eocene reptiles of North America
Taxa named by Othniel Charles Marsh
Fossil taxa described in 1871